Gerry McInerney (born 14 March 1965 in Kinvara) is a former Irish sportsperson. He played hurling with his local club Kinvara and with the Galway senior inter-county team in the 1980s and 1990s.

Career

McInerney traveled to the USA in 1985 to play hurling for the weekend and ended up staying there for the next five years until returning permanently in 1990. Each year he had traveled back in August to play for Galway in the All-Ireland semi-finals. He became known for his white boots which he purchased in the USA. 
He won back-to-back All-Ireland winners' medals with Galway in 1987 and 1988. At the age of 42 he was the player-coach for the 2007 Kinvara squad.

Honours

Galway
All-Ireland Senior Hurling Championship (2): 1987, 1988

References

1965 births
Living people
Kinvara hurlers
Galway inter-county hurlers
Connacht inter-provincial hurlers
All-Ireland Senior Hurling Championship winners
People from Kinvara